Arcangeliella is a genus of gasteroid fungi in the family Russulaceae. Taxonomic and phylogenetic research has shown that it is very likely a synonym of Lactarius. The type species Arcangeliella borziana was moved to Lactarius in 2003. However, the genus name is still in use for several species for which new combinations have not yet been proposed.

The genus was circumscribed by Fridiano Cavara in Nuovo Giorn. Bot. Ital. ser.2, vol.7 on page 125 in 1900. 

The genus name of Arcangeliella is in honour of Giovanni Arcangeli (1840–1921), who was an Italian botanist from Florence.

Species
As accepted by Species Fungorum;

 Arcangeliella ambigua 
 Arcangeliella beccarii 
 Arcangeliella borziana 
 Arcangeliella brunneola 
 Arcangeliella claridgei 
 Arcangeliella corkii 
 Arcangeliella curtisii 
 Arcangeliella daucina 
 Arcangeliella ellipsoidea 
 Arcangeliella laevis 
 Arcangeliella luteocarnea 
 Arcangeliella magna 
 Arcangeliella major 
 Arcangeliella mitsueae 
 Arcangeliella occidentalis 
 Arcangeliella rosea 
 Arcangeliella socialis 
 Arcangeliella tenax 

Former species; (assume all are Russulaceae family, unless noted)

 A. africana  = Neosecotium africanum, Agaricaceae family
 A. alveolata  = Zelleromyces alveolatus
 A. asterosperma  = Octaviania asterosperma, Boletaceae
 A. asterosperma var. depauperata  = Octaviania depauperata, Boletaceae
 A. asterosperma var. hololeuca  = Octaviania asterosperma, Boletaceae
 A. australiensis  = Zelleromyces australiensis
 A. behrii  = Xerocomellus behrii, Boletaceae
 A. behrii var. caudata  = Xerocomellus behrii, Boletaceae
 A. campbelliae  = Cortinarius campbelliae, Cortinariaceae
 A. camphorata  = Lactarius silviae,
 A. caudata  = Chamonixia caudata, Boletaceae
 A. crassa  = Lactarius crassus
 A. cremea  = Russula dodgei
 A. crichtonii  = Lactarius crichtonii
 A. densa  = Lactarius densus
 A. densa  = Lactarius densus
 A. desjardinii  = Lactarius desjardinii
 A. dolichocaulis  = Lactarius dolichocaulis
 A. gardneri  = Lactarius gardneri
 A. giennensis  = Lactarius giennensis
 A. glabrella  = Zelleromyces glabrellus
 A. hepaticus  = Lactarius beatonii
 A. josserandii  = Lactarius josserandii
 A. krjukowensis  = Russula krjukowensis
 A. krjukowensis var. michailowskiana  = Russula krjukowensis
 A. lactarioides  = Lactarius lactarioides
 A. lactifera  = Zelleromyces lactifer
 A. majus  = Arcangeliella major 
 A. malaiensis  = Zelleromyces malaiensis
 A. nana  = Hymenogaster nanus, Hymenogastraceae
 A. nanjingensis  = Russula nanjingensis
 A. oregonensis  = Zelleromyces oregonensis
 A. papyracea  = Zelleromyces papyraceus
 A. parva  = Lactarius paulus
 A. pilosa  = Russula pilosa
 A. pterospora  = Zelleromyces pterosporus
 A. ramispina  = Zelleromyces ramispinus
 A. ravenelii  = Zelleromyces ravenelii
 A. rogersonii  = Zelleromyces rogersonii
 A. saylorii  = Lactarius saylorii
 A. scissilis  = Zelleromyces scissilis
 A. sculptispora  = Zelleromyces sculptisporus
 A. seminuda  = Russula seminuda
 A. soederstroemii  = Octaviania soderstromii, Boletaceae
 A. stephensii  = Lactarius stephensii
 A. stephensii var. borziana  = Lactarius borzianus
 A. tasmanica  = Octaviania tasmanica, Boletaceae
 A. texta  = Lactarius textus
 A. variegata  = Lactarius variegatus
 A. versicaulis  = Zelleromyces versicaulis
 A. violacea  = Cortinarius subviolaceus, Cortinariaceae
 A. volemoides  = Lactarius borzianus
 A. vulvaria  = Clathrogaster vulvarius, Hysterangiaceae

References

Russulales
Russulales genera